Bernard du Boucheron (born 18 July 1928 in Paris) is a French writer.

Awards
2004 Grand Prix du roman de l'Académie française for his first novel Court Serpent (Gallimard).
2010 Impac Dublin award

Bibliography
Court serpent, Gallimard, 2004, 
The Voyage of the Short Serpent: a novel, Translated Hester Velmans, Overlook Press, 2008, 
Un Roi, une princesse et une pieuvre, (a king, a princess and an octopus.) Gallimard Jeunesse, 2005, 
Coup-de-Fouet, (Whiplash) Gallimard, 2006.
Chien des Os, (Dog of the Bones) Gallimard, 2007.
Vue Mer, (Seaside View) Gallimard, 2009. 
Salaam la France, Gallimard, 2010.

References

Living people
1928 births
French male writers
Grand Prix du roman de l'Académie française winners